The Luy de Béarn (literally Luy of Béarn) is a left tributary of the Luy, in the Southwest of France.

Geography 
The source of the Luy de Béarn is at the base of the plateau of Ger, east of Pau. It flows north-west through the Chalosse region and joins the Luy de France to form the Luy below the castle of Gaujacq.

Départements and towns 

The Luy de Béarn flows through the following departments and towns:
 Pyrénées-Atlantiques: Montardon, Sauvagnon, Sault-de-Navailles
 Landes: Amou

Main tributaries 
 (L) Aïgue Longue, from the moor of Pont-Long in the north of Pau.
 (L) Uzan, in Uzan, also from Pont-Long.
 (L) Aubin.
 (L) Oursoû, from the nord of Orthez.

References

Rivers of France
Rivers of Landes (department)
Rivers of Pyrénées-Atlantiques
Rivers of Nouvelle-Aquitaine